The 1994–95 Welsh Alliance League was the eleventh season of the Welsh Alliance League after its establishment in 1984. The league was won by Rhydymwyn.

League table

References

External links
Welsh Alliance League

Welsh Alliance League seasons
3